U.C. Sampdoria started its march towards an eventual Serie A championship and European Cup final with its appointment of Yugoslav coach Vujadin Boškov. With Britons Graeme Souness and Trevor Francis leaving the squad, Boškov built his team around young Italian players, with Roberto Mancini, Gianluca Vialli, Pietro Vierchowod and Moreno Mannini among the bulwark of the squad as Sampdoria finished 6th in a tight battle involving several teams for 3rd in the championship.

Squad

Goalkeepers
  Roberto Bocchino
  Guido Bistazzoni
  Gianluca Pagliuca

Defenders
  Moreno Mannini
  Pietro Vierchowod
  Luca Pellegrini
  Enzo Gambaro
  Antonio Paganin
  Michele Zanutta

Midfielders
  Hans-Peter Briegel
  Fausto Pari
  Luca Fusi
  Toninho Cerezo
  Fausto Salsano

Attackers
  Maurizio Ganz
  Giuseppe Lorenzo
  Roberto Mancini
  Gianluca Vialli

Competitions

Serie A

League table

Matches

UEFA Cup qualification

Milan qualified for 1987-88 UEFA Cup.

Coppa Italia

First round 

 Cremonese qualifies by Goal difference.

Topscorers
  Gianluca Vialli 12
  Roberto Mancini 6
  Toninho Cerezo 3
  Giuseppe Lorenzo 3

References

Sources
RSSSF - Italy 1986/87

U.C. Sampdoria seasons
Sampdoria